Harry Stafford (born 15 September 1993 in Leicester) is a British former Grand Prix motorcycle racer. He has also competed in the Red Bull MotoGP Rookies Cup, British 125 Championship and the British National Superstock 1000 Championship, he last competed in the European Superstock 600 Championship aboard a Honda CBR600RR.

Career statistics

2008 - 24th, Red Bull MotoGP Rookies Cup #24    KTM FRR 125
2009 - 15th, Red Bull MotoGP Rookies Cup #24    KTM FRR 125 / 18th, British 125 Championship #21    Honda RS125R
2010 - 7th, Red Bull MotoGP Rookies Cup #24    KTM FRR 125 / 27th, British 125 Championship #21    Honda RS125R
2011 - 28th, 125cc World Championship #21    Aprilia RS 125 R
2012 - No ride 
2013 - NC, National Superstock 1000 Championship #21    MV Agusta F4
2014 - 45th, European Superstock 600 Championship #21    Honda CBR600RR

Grand Prix motorcycle racing

By season

Races by year
(key) (Races in bold indicate pole position, races in italics indicate fastest lap)

References

External links
 Profile on motogp.com

1993 births
Living people
English motorcycle racers
125cc World Championship riders